The Commission on the Unification of Pronunciation was the organization established by the Beiyang government in 1912 to select ancillary phonetic symbols for Mandarin (resulting in the creation of Zhuyin) and set the standard Guoyu pronunciation of basic Chinese characters.

History 
It was decided in a draft on 7 August 1912, a month after a conference led by the Cai Yuanpei on July 10, that a set of phonetic symbols were to be used for education purposes. The Commission was set up in December, led by Wu Zhihui (Woo Tsin-hang). The Commission ended on 22 May 1913. A later similar organization that still exists that had been headed by Wu Zhihui for a while is the Mandarin Promotion Council.

Members 
The first meeting took place on 15 February 1913 in Beijing, with 44 delegates. The chairman was Wu; vice-chairman Wang Zhao. There were two representatives per each of the 26 provinces. The Tibetans, the Mongolians and the overseas Chinese each had one representative. Prominent members included:
 Cai Zhang
 Chen Suiyi
 Gao Kunnan
 Hu Yuren
 Li Liangcai
 Liu Zishan
 Lu Zhuangzhang
 Ma Tiqian
 Wang Rongbao
 Wang Sui
 Wang Yi'an
 Xing Dao
 Yang Qu
 Yang Zenghao

Phonetic symbols 
There were three main ideas of how the phonetic symbols should be:
 Using certain complete Chinese characters to symbolize other characters of the same sound
 Supporters included Wang Zhao, Wang Rongbao, Wang Yi'an, and Cai.
 Using Latin alphabet letters
 Supporters included Yang Zenghao and Liu
 Using non-existent symbols
 Supporters included Wu, Lu, Ma, Li, Xing, Wang Sui, Hu, Yang Qu, Gao, Chen, and Zheng.

The three groups discussed for two months and adopted 15 symbols from Zhang Binglin's all-Zhuanshu Jiyin Zimu (記音字母), which was the proposal by the Zhejiang Committee. Jiyin Zimu was renamed to Zhuyin Fuhao.

After its proclamation, several aspects of Zhuyin were further modified, including:
  Rearranging the order of the symbols
  Adding ㄜ (Pinyin e)
  ㄦ, originally just r, was now also er (a retroflex vowel)
  The three dialectal symbols — ㄪ (v), ㄫ (ng) and ㄬ (ny) — were deleted, but are still to be found in Unicode Bopomofo (U+3105–U+312C).
  The tone system was modified

Programs 
The Commission established the Seven Mandarin Sound Promotion Programs (Guoyu Tuixing Fangfa Qi Tiao):
 Proclaimed Zhuyin Zimu. [On 23 November 1918]
 All provinces were to establish places to promote and study the 6500 standardized Mandarin sounds, where the county representatives would gather and return to their counties to spread the words. [Established in 1920, along with Summer Mandarin Seminars]
 Using the gramophone to record the exact pronunciation. [Recorded in 1920]
 Having Mandarin be a compulsory subject in all elementary school. [Implemented in 19??]
 All teachers were to speak solely in Mandarin in elementary and middle schools. [Implemented in 19??]
 All textbooks and some official documents were to be annotated by Zhuyin. [Implemented in 19??]

References

Further reading
DeFrancis, John, 1950, Nationalism and Language Reform in China, Princeton University Press, Chapter 4: One State, One People, One Language

Chinese language
1912 establishments in China
Language regulators